Hélène Bergès (born August 27, 1966 in Pau) is a French scientist and was the Director of the French Plant Genomic Resources Center from its foundation until 2019.

Education
Bergès completed a doctorate in 1995 at the Toulouse III - Paul Sabatier University in the fields of genetics and molecular biology.

Career
After her PhD, Bergès joined the National Institute for Agricultural Research (INRA) in 1998, to first focus on research in studying plant interactions with microbes. In 2003, her position at INRA allowed her to found a separate department called the French Plant Genomic Resources Center (CNRGV) where she was the director until 2019. Employing some twenty people, the CNRGV is involved in various international sequencing consortia, develops various projects funded by the French Government (Grand Emprunt), the French National Research Agency (ANR) or the European Union, in collaboration with various laboratories all around the world. Along other activities, Hélène Bergès is member of the scientific committee of the Parliamentary Office for the Evaluation of Scientific and Technological Options (OPECST). In 2021, she was one of the researchers highlighted in the " La Science taille XX elles" exhibition presented in Toulouse.

Research
Bergès' early research used Escherichia coli as a model system to examine cytokines and plasmid copy numbers. She then she moved on to examine the bacterial cells associated with plant roots including the development of microarrays which allowed her to quantify gene expression in these bacteria. She was an early adopter of the need to sequence plant genomes, and her recent work includes large-scale sequencing projects including those generating genomic information on barley, wheat, and sunflowers.

Selected publications

Awards and honors
The National Institute for Agricultural Research gave Bergès their 2012 engineering award. She was one of ten recipients of the 2015 Vermeil Medal of the French Academy of Agriculture, and she was given the 2018 "Outstanding Leadership Award" from the International Wheat Genome Sequencing Consortium, for "her leadership in BAC pooling and BAC libraries". In 2015, she was made Knight of Legion of Honour, and she is also a Knight of the Order of Agricultural Merit.

References

Further reading

External links

1966 births
Living people
20th-century French botanists
Paul Sabatier University alumni
Knights of the Order of Agricultural Merit
Chevaliers of the Légion d'honneur
21st-century French botanists
French geneticists